Sweet Silence is the sixth studio album by Berlin-based musician Barbara Morgenstern.

Track listing

Personnel 

Barbara Morgenstern - composer, lyricist, primary artist, producer
T. Raumschmiere - mixing

References 

 http://www.discogs.com/Barbara-Morgenstern-Sweet-Silence/release/3664441

2012 albums
Barbara Morgenstern albums